The Origin of Evil is a French and Canadian thriller drama film, directed by Sébastien Marnier and released in 2022. The film stars Laure Calamy as Stéphane, a fish cannery worker who discovers that she is the biological daughter of wealthy businessman Serge (Jacques Weber), and is being introduced to his established family despite their unwillingness to accept her.

The cast also includes Dominique Blanc, Suzanne Clément, Doria Tillier, Naidra Ayadi, Clotilde Mollet, Céleste Brunnquell and Véronique Ruggia.

The film premiered on 1 September 2022 at the 79th Venice International Film Festival, and is slated to have its North American premiere at the 2022 Toronto International Film Festival, in advance of its commercial release in October.

Critical response
The film was compared by critics to both Knives Out and Patricia Highsmith's The Talented Mr. Ripley series.

David Katz of Cineuropa wrote that the film "feels like the sort of movie you might’ve caught half-asleep on late-night TV in the pre-streaming age, perhaps after having missed the first 15 minutes – forcing you to stay glued until the very end, drooping eyelids be damned. Or, to be less flattering, it feels like the kind of brisk, undemanding, back-of-the-seat entertainment that might make a few hours of a long-haul flight melt away."

For Screen Daily, Allan Hunter wrote that "Marnier’s agile screenplay takes us beyond surface appearances to reveal the hidden agendas at play. Propelled by revelations, twists and a seasoning of sly humour, The Origin Of Evil is very watchable, even if some ingredients propel it towards parody. The mention of a secret passage and the rumbles of thunder to signal the coming denouement over egg pudding, not to mention the score by Philippe Brault and Pierre Lapointe, flirt with Victorian melodrama."

References

External links

2022 films
2022 thriller films
French thriller drama films
Canadian thriller drama films
French-language Canadian films
2020s French-language films
2020s Canadian films
2020s French films